Igor Kuzmin (born 23 November 1982) is an Estonian rower. He is a member of rowing club "SK Narva Energia" located in Narva.

Junior years
Kuzmin was born in Narva. In 2000 Kuzmin competed in the World Rowing Junior Championships in the single sculls event, finishing in 12th position. In 2002 he competed in the U-23 World Regatta with Andrei Jämsä in the double sculls event, finishing in 7th position.

Olympic Games
His first appearance in the Olympic Games was in Athens 2004, where he competed in the quadruple sculls event with Andrei Jämsä, Andrei Šilin and Oleg Vinogradov earning 9th position overall.

Kuzmin's second appearance at the Olympics was in Beijing 2008 where he competed in the quadruple sculls event with Allar Raja, Vladimir Latin and Kaspar Taimsoo. The men were 4th in their preliminary heat and won the repechage. In the semifinals they finished fourth and did not get to Final A. The final place was 9th as they finished third in Final B.

World championships
Kuzmin debuted in the World Rowing Championships in 2002 in Seville, Spain, he was a member of the quadruple sculls team with Tõnu Endrekson, Andrei Šilin, and Silver Sonntak. They won the Final B and earned 7th place.

2003 in Milan, Italy he competed in the double sculls event with Jämsä, earning 9th position overall.

Kuzmin won his first World Championships medal in 2006 in Eton, Great Britain in the quadruple sculls event with Jämsä, Endrekson and Allar Raja.

2007 in Munich, Germany he competed in the quadruple sculls event with Raja, Vladimir Latin and Kaspar Taimsoo earning 8th position.

2009 in Poznań, Poland ha was again a part of the Estonia's quadruple sculls team, this time together with Andrei Jämsä, Tõnu Endrekson and Vladimir Latin. The team achieved 10th position overall.

European Championships
2007 in Poznań, Poland he competed in the quadruple sculls event with Raja, Latin and Taimsoo earning 5th position.

2009 in Brest, Belarus he was a member of the quadruple sculls team with Valeri Prosvirin, Tõnu Endrekson and Andrei Jämsä. They earned 8th place.

2010 in Montemor-o-Velho, Portugal Kuzmin, Prosvirin, Jämsä and Latin were 8th once more.

Rowing World Cup

Henley Royal Regatta

2008 – Queen Mother Challenge Cup

References

External links
 

1982 births
Estonian male rowers
Rowers at the 2004 Summer Olympics
Rowers at the 2008 Summer Olympics
Olympic rowers of Estonia
Living people
Sportspeople from Narva
Estonian people of Russian descent
World Rowing Championships medalists for Estonia